May 1 - Eastern Orthodox Church calendar - May 3

All fixed commemorations below celebrated on May 15 by Orthodox Churches on the Old Calendar.

For May 2nd, Orthodox Churches on the Old Calendar commemorate the Saints listed on April 19.

Saints
 Martyrs Hesperos (Exuperius) and Zoe, and their sons Cyriacos and Theodoulos, at Attalia (c. 124)
 Saint Jordan the Wonderworker
 Saint Sabbas, Bishop of Dafnousia
 Saint Boris-Michael, Prince and baptizer of Bulgaria, Equal-to-the-Apostles (907)

Pre-Schism Western saints
 Saint Valentine, Bishop of Genoa in Italy c. 295-307, (c. 307)
 Saint Germanus of Normandy, converted by St Germanus of Auxerre, martyred in France (c. 460)
 Hieromartyrs Vindemialis, Eugene and Longinus, Bishops in North Africa martyred by the Arian Vandal King Hunneric (c. 485)
 Saint Neachtain, a relative of St Patrick of Ireland at whose repose he was present (5th century)
 Saint Ultan, Irish monk, brother of Saints Fursey and Foillan (657)
 Saint Waldebert (Walbert, Gaubert), abbot of Luxeuil in France (c. 668)
 Saint Bertinus the Younger, Benedictine monk at Sithin, in France (699)
 Saint Felix of Seville, deacon and martyr in Seville, Spain, under the Muslims.
 Martyr Wiborada, anchoress of St. Gallen Abbey in Germany (926)

Post-Schism Orthodox saints
 St. Athanasius of Syandem and Valaam (c. 1550)
 Patriarch Athanasius III Patelaros, of Constantinople, from Lubensk (Lubny), Wonderworker (1654)
 Blessed Basil of Kadom, fool-for-Christ (1848)
 Saint Matrona the Blind, the Righteous Wonderworker of Moscow (1952){{#tag:ref|On February 15, 2018, the Holy Synod of the Romanian Patriarchate resolved that the Blessed Matrona of Moscow also be included in the Calendar of the Romanian Orthodox Church for veneration.<ref>Blessed Matrona of Moscow Included in Romanian Orthodox Church Calendar. PRAVMIR.COM. 26 APRIL 2018.</ref>|group=note}}

Other commemorations
 Translation of the relics of Patriarch Athanasius of Alexandria (Athanasios the Great) (373)
 Translation of the relics (1072 and 1115) of the holy passion-bearers Boris and Gleb (in holy baptism Romanus and David) (1015)Translation of the relics of the Holy Passionbearer Boris, in Holy Baptism Roman. OCA - Feasts and Saints. 
 Icon of the Theotokos of Putivilsk (1238, 1635)May 15, 2011 / May 2, HOLY TRINITY RUSSIAN ORTHODOX CHURCH (A parish of the Patriarchate of Moscow)

Icon gallery

Notes

References

Sources
 May 2/15, Orthodox Calendar (PRAVOSLAVIE.RU)
 May 15, 2011 / May 2, HOLY TRINITY RUSSIAN ORTHODOX CHURCH (A parish of the Patriarchate of Moscow)
 Dr. Alexander Roman. May. Calendar of Ukrainian Orthodox Saints (Ukrainian Orthodoxy - Українське Православ'я).
 May 2. Latin Saints of the Orthodox Patriarchate of Rome.
 The Roman Martyrology. Transl. by the Archbishop of Baltimore. Last Edition, According to the Copy Printed at Rome in 1914. Revised Edition, with the Imprimatur of His Eminence Cardinal Gibbons. Baltimore: John Murphy Company, 1916. pp. 124–125.
 Rev. Richard Stanton. A Menology of England and Wales, or, Brief Memorials of the Ancient British and English Saints Arranged According to the Calendar, Together with the Martyrs of the 16th and 17th Centuries. London: Burns & Oates, 1892. pp. 192–193.
Greek Sources
 Great Synaxaristes:  2 ΜΑΪΟΥ, ΜΕΓΑΣ ΣΥΝΑΞΑΡΙΣΤΗΣ.
  Συναξαριστής. 2 Μαΐου.'' ECCLESIA.GR. (H ΕΚΚΛΗΣΙΑ ΤΗΣ ΕΛΛΑΔΟΣ). 
Russian Sources
  15 мая (2 мая). Православная Энциклопедия под редакцией Патриарха Московского и всея Руси Кирилла (электронная версия). (Orthodox Encyclopedia - Pravenc.ru).
  2 мая (ст.ст.) 15 мая 2013 (нов. ст.). Русская Православная Церковь Отдел внешних церковных связей. (DECR).

May in the Eastern Orthodox calendar